Augusto Caminito (1 July 1939 – 23 August 2020) was an Italian film director, screenwriter, and producer.

Filmography

Screenwriter
Halleluja for Django (1967)
The Ruthless Four (1968)
The Vatican Affair (1968)
Trop jolies pour être honnêtes (1972)
The Great Kidnapping (1973)
Brothers Blue (1973)
The Cat (1977)
The Witness (1978)
I Know That You Know That I Know (1982)

Director
Grandi cacciatori (1988)
Vampire in Venice (1988)

Producer
Ne parliamo Lunedì (1990)

References

1939 births
2020 deaths
Italian film producers
Italian film directors
Italian screenwriters
Film people from Naples